Roman Catholic Church, Roman Church or Church of Rome may refer to:
 The Catholic Church
 The Latin Church in particular, one of the 24 autonomous (sui iuris) churches that constitute the Catholic Church
 Any part of the Latin Church that uses the Roman Rite
 The Diocese of Rome, the local Catholic church of the city of Rome, including Vatican City

See also
Roman Catholic (term)
Catholic (disambiguation)
Catholic Church (disambiguation)
Catholic (term)
Catholicity
Church (disambiguation)